The 2014 Butler Bulldogs football team represented Butler University in the 2014 NCAA Division I FCS football season. They were led by ninth-year head coach Jeff Voris and played their home games at the Butler Bowl. They were a member of the Pioneer Football League. They finished the season 4–7, 2–6 in PFL play to finish in a tie for ninth place.

Schedule

Source: Schedule

References

Butler
Butler Bulldogs football seasons
Butler Bulldogs football